Bovrup-kartoteket ("The Bovrup File") is a partial transcript of the member file of the National Socialist Workers' Party of Denmark (DNSAP) created in 1945 by Danish resistance members and published as a book in 1946. The transcript is named after Bovrup, the hometown of DNSAP's leader Frits Clausen who created the actual DNSAP member file.
The transcript is incomplete with 22,795 entries, while the actual DNSAP member file had 50,000 entries.

The year the Bovrup File was published, the court of Copenhagen classified the file leaving only historians with access to it.

In November 2018 an association of Danish genealogists published the subset of 5,265 entries for members born in 1908 or before, i.e. at least 110 years ago.

Prominent DNSAP members found in the Bovrup File

References

External links 
 

1940s in Denmark
 
Military history of Denmark during World War II
Denmark
Danish resistance movement